Lee Harley (born 7 July 1967) is an English footballer, who played as a forward in the Football League for Chester City.

References

Chester City F.C. players
Rhyl F.C. players
Association football forwards
English Football League players
Living people
1967 births
Sportspeople from Crewe
English footballers